Norway is set to participate in the Eurovision Song Contest 2023 in Liverpool, United Kingdom, with "Queen of Kings" performed by Alessandra. The Norwegian broadcaster  (NRK) organised the national final Melodi Grand Prix 2023 in order to select the Norwegian entry for the 2023 contest. 21 entries were selected to compete in the national final, which consists of four shows: three semi-finals and a final. Nine entries ultimately qualified to compete in the final on 4 February 2023, and the winner was determined following the combination of votes from ten international jury groups and a public online vote.

Background

Norway also has the two dubious distinctions of having finished last in the Eurovision final more than any other country and for having the most  (zero points) in the contest, the latter being a record the nation shared together with Austria. The country has finished last eleven times and has failed to score a point in four contests. In , "Give That Wolf a Banana" performed by Subwoolfer qualified to the final and placed tenth.

The Norwegian national broadcaster,  (NRK), broadcasts the event within Norway and organises the selection process for the nation's entry. NRK confirmed their intentions to participate at the 2023 Eurovision Song Contest on 6 June 2022. The broadcaster has traditionally organised the national final , which has selected the Norwegian entry for the Eurovision Song Contest in all but one of their participations. Along with their participation confirmation, the broadcaster revealed details regarding their selection procedure and announced the organization of  2023 in order to select the 2023 Norwegian entry.

Before Eurovision

Melodi Grand Prix 2023 

 2023 was the 61st edition of the Norwegian national final  which selected Norway's entry for the 2023 contest. The competition consisted of three semi-finals at Screen Studios in Nydalen on 14, 21 and 28 February 2023 and a final at the Trondheim Spektrum in Trondheim. In each semi-final, seven songs competed and the top three entries were selected to proceed to the final. The results in the semi-finals were determined exclusively by online voting, while the results in the final were determined by online voting and ten international jury groups.

Semi-finals 

 The first semi-final took place on 14 January 2023. "Queen of Kings" performed by Alessandra, "Geronimo" performed by Umami Tsunami and "Honestly" performed by Ulrikke Brandstorp advanced to the final, while "Wave" performed by Eirik Næss, "" performed by Rasmus Thall, "" performed by Kate Gulbrandsen and "Freaky for the Weekend" performed by Byron Williams Jr. & Jowst were eliminated.
 The second semi-final took place on 21 January 2023. "" performed by Jone, "Prohibition" performed by Swing'it and "Love You in a Dream" performed by Elsie Bay advanced to the final, while "" performed by Sandra Lyng, "Fuego" performed by Alejandro Fuentes, "Waist" performed by Ella and "Turn Off My Heart" performed by Bjørn Olav Edvardsen were eliminated.
 The third semi-final took place on 28 January 2023. "Love Again" performed by Skrellex, "Not Meant to Be" performed by Eline Thorp and "Masterpiece" performed by Atle Pettersen advanced to the final, while "Triumph" performed by Akuvi, "Break It" performed by Tiril, "Someday" performed by Stig van Eijk and "Freya" performed by Maria Celin were eliminated.

Final 
The final took place on 4 February 2023.

At Eurovision 
According to Eurovision rules, all nations with the exceptions of the host country and the "Big Five" (France, Germany, Italy, Spain and the United Kingdom) are required to qualify from one of two semi-finals in order to compete for the final; the top ten countries from each semi-final progress to the final. The European Broadcasting Union (EBU) split up the competing countries into six different pots based on voting patterns from previous contests, with countries with favourable voting histories put into the same pot. On 31 January 2023, an allocation draw was held, which placed each country into one of the two semi-finals, and determined which half of the show they would perform in. Norway has been placed into the first semi-final, to be held on 9 May 2023, and has been scheduled to perform in the first half of the show.

References

External links

2023
Countries in the Eurovision Song Contest 2023
Eurovision
Eurovision